Clear Sky Lodge Airport  is a public-use airport located four nautical miles (7 km) south of the central business district of Clear, Alaska, United States. This airport is privately owned by Rabideau's Clear Sky Lodge.

Note that CLF is not the IATA code for that airport; CLF has been assigned by IATA to the Coltishall military airbase in England, now closed.

Facilities and aircraft 
Clear Sky Lodge Airport has one runway designated 2/20 with a 2,500 by 20 ft (762 x 6 m) gravel and dirt surface. For 12-month period ending December 31, 2005, the airport had 800 aircraft operations, an average of 66 per month, all of which were general aviation.

See also 
 Clear Airport (FAA: Z84, ICAO: PACL)

References

External links 
 Alaska FAA airport diagram (GIF)

Airports in Denali Borough, Alaska